Hansa-Sandesha or "The message of the Swan"  is a Sanskrit love poem written by Vedanta Desika in the 13th century AD.  A short lyric poem of 110 verses, it describes how Rama, hero of the Ramayana epic, sends a message via a swan to his beloved wife, Sita, who has been abducted by the demon king Ravana.  The poem belongs to the  "messenger poem" genre and is very closely modeled upon the Meghadūta of Kālidāsa. It has particular significance for Srivaishnavites, whose god, Vishnu, it celebrates.

Sources 
The Hansa-Sandesha owes a great deal to its two poetic predecessors, Kālidāsa's Meghadūta and Valmīki's Ramāyana. Vedanta Desika's use of the Meghaduta is extensive and transparently deliberate;
his poem is a response to one of India's most famous poems by its most celebrated poet. Vedanta Desika's debt to Valmīki is perhaps more pervasive but less obvious, and possibly less deliberate too. Where the poet consciously plays with Kalidasa's verse, he treats the Ramayana more as a much-cherished story.  Nevertheless, he is clearly as familiar with the details of Valmiki's poem as with Kalidasa's, and he echoes very specific images and details from the epic.

The poet 
He was a prolific writer in both Tamil and Sanskrit, composing over 100 philosophical, devotional and literary works; the Hamsa-Sandesha is his only work of this kind.

Vedanta Desika was born in 1269 AD. One popular story about his birth and childhood runs as follows: His devout parents were childless. One day they were visited in two separate but simultaneous dreams in which they were instructed to go to Tirupati, an important pilgrimage spot in south India, where they would be given a son. Once there, his mother had another dream in which she gave birth to Venkatesha's (the god of Tirupati)  (bell). The next day the temple bell was missing and the chief priest, who had also had a visitation, celebrated the imminent birth of a child sent by the lord. A talented child, he amazed the senior priests at the age of five and proclaimed that he had learnt all there was to know by 20.

Vedanta Desika was the chief acharya of Kanchi (now Kanchipuram in Tamil Nadu), the centre of the northern Srivaishnavite community, but later went to live in Srirangam (a town near Trichy in southern Tamil Nadu), the centre of the southern Srivaishnavites.  He died at Srirangam in 1370, having returned to the city after its re-capture by Hindus following a Muslim sack. Vedanta Desika's intent of writing such a poem was to attract Sanskrit Literature fans and purists towards the SriVaishnava Philosophy by using this poem as a medium of introducing Srivaishnava concepts in the poem.

Structure of the text
The poem is divided into two clear parts, in line with Kalidasa's Meghaduta.  The first half, of 60 stanzas, describes how Rama sights and engages the swan as his messenger,
and then describes to the swan the route he should take and the many places – primarily holy spots -  he ought to stop on the way.
The second part begins in Lanka where the poet introduces us to the ashoka grove where Sita is being held,
the  tree beneath which she sits,
and finally Sita herself in a string of verses.
The actual message to Sita consists of only 16 verses,
after which Rama dismisses the swan and the narrator completes the story of the Ramayana. The poem ends with an autobiographical note by the poet.

Hamsa
Although popularly thought of as a swan, particularly in modern India, ornithologists have noted that swans do not, and never have, existed in the Indian avifauna, and Western translations tend to plump for 'goose', or 'flamingo'; 'crane' is also a possibility.

Genre
The  ('messenger poem') genre is one of the best defined in Indian literature. There are about 55 messenger poems in Sanskrit, plus others written in vernacular tongues. These span India chronologically, topographically and ideologically: there are Muslim and Christian messenger poems, and poets are still composing these poems today. Each follows Kalidasa's Meghaduta to a greater or lesser extent. And they adhere to a bipartite structure in which the first half charts the journey the messenger is to follow, while the second describes the messenger's destination, the recipient and the message itself.

Metre
The metre used in Hamsa-Sandesha is the slow  ('slowly advancing') metre which is thought to be suitable for the love-in-separation theme. The specifications of this metre are encapsulated in the following line (which is itself set to the  rhythm):The line means, by way of several technical abbreviations, that the  metre has a natural break after the first four syllables and then after the next six, with the last seven syllables as one group. It is further defined as containing several different gaṇas, i.e., poetical feet consisting of predefined combinations of guru and laghu – long and short – syllables. When each line is scanned it looks like the following:

(– – –) ( – | u u ) ( u u u ) (– | – u) (– – u) (–) (–)

with the vertical bars representing the natural pauses and the brackets the predefined feet. Each stanza consists of four lines or pādas.

In European terms, the scansion may be written out as follows:
| – – – – | u u u u u – | – u – – u – x |

Commentaries
Commentaries include one by Agyatkartrik.

Views and criticism
The Hamsa-Sandesha was written during the medieval literary resurgence, long after the classical heyday of Sanskrit literature, and falls into the category of post-1000 AD regional Sanskrit literature.  Such literature tended to enjoy less national recognition than its predecessors and in modern India literary works of this type are all but forgotten. The Hamsa-Sandesha too has slipped into obscurity for all but Srivaishnavites.

What criticism and discussion there is tends to focus either on the Hamsa-Sandesha in the shadow of the Meghaduta'', or on its religious and philosophical significance.  Modern Western scholarship on the poem and its author includes books and articles by Stephen P Hopkins, and by Yigal Bronner and David Shulman.

Notes

Citations

Works cited

13th-century poems
Hindu texts
Sanskrit poetry
Works based on the Ramayana